Asaduzzaman Mohammad Raisul Islam (known as Raisul Islam Asad; born 15 July 1953) is a Bangladeshi freedom fighter and an actor in radio, theatre, television and film. He won Bangladesh National Film Award for Best Actor four times for his roles in the films Padma Nadir Majhi (1993), Anya Jibon (1995), Dukhai (1997) and Lalsalu (2001). Besides, he won Best Supporting Actor award twice for the roles in Ghani: The Cycle (2006) and Mrittika Maya (2013). As of 2016, he acted in more than 50 films. He was a member of the Crack Platoon an elite urban guerilla, intelligence and commando unit of the Mukti Bahini.

Early life and career
Asad studied in Dhaka Collegiate School. He completed his bachelor's degree and masters in sociology from the University of Dhaka. In 1972, Asad debuted in acting through his roles on the stage dramas Ami Raja Hobo Na and Shorpo Bishoyok Golpo on the same day. His first acted feature film was Abar Tora Manush Ho (1973) directed by Khan Ataur Rahman.

As a Freedom Fighter he received Rahe Bhander Ennoble Award in 2016.

Personal life
Asad married Tahira Dil Afroz in 1979. Together they have a daughter, Rubaina Zaman. He has a sister named Nurjahan.

Filmography

References

External links

Living people
1953 births
People from Dhaka
University of Dhaka alumni
Bangladeshi male film actors
Bangladeshi male television actors
Bangladeshi male stage actors
Bangladeshi male voice actors
Best Actor National Film Award (Bangladesh) winners
Best Supporting Actor National Film Award (Bangladesh) winners
Recipients of the Ekushey Padak
Dhaka Collegiate School alumni
National Film Award (Bangladesh) for Lifetime Achievement recipients